Europium(III) arsenate is an arsenate salt of europium, with the chemical formula of EuAsO4. It has good thermal stability, with its pKsp,c of 22.53±0.03. It is a colorless crystal with a xenotime structure.

Preparation
Europium(III) arsenate can be prepared by reacting sodium arsenate (Na3AsO4) in a europium(III) chloride (EuCl3) solution:
 Na3AsO4 + EuCl3 → 3 NaCl + EuAsO4↓

Reacting europium(III) oxide (Eu2O3) with arsenic pentoxide (As2O5) can also obtain europium(III) arsenate.
Eu2O3 + As2O5 → 2EuAsO4

References

Europium(III) compounds
Arsenates